Aluminum laurate is an metal-organic compound with the chemical formula . The compound is classified as a metallic soap, i.e. a metal derivative of a fatty acid (lauric acid).

Physical properties
Aluminum laurate forms white powder.

Soluble in water.

Use
Aluminum laurate is used as an anticaking agent, free-flow agent, or emulsifier.

References

Laurates
Aluminium compounds